Tipton County Jail and Sheriff's Home is a historic combined jail and sheriff's residence located at Tipton, Tipton County, Indiana. It was designed by Adolph Scherrer who also designed the 1888 Indiana State Capitol and Tipton County Courthouse and built in 1894–1895.  It is constructed of red brick with stone trim and consists of a -story residence and two-story jail section. The residence has a hip on gable roof, the jail a hipped roof, and there is a three-story tower located between the two sections.

It was added to the National Register of Historic Places in 1984.

References

Jails on the National Register of Historic Places in Indiana
Government buildings completed in 1895
Buildings and structures in Tipton County, Indiana
National Register of Historic Places in Tipton County, Indiana
Jails in Indiana
Houses on the National Register of Historic Places in Indiana